is a Japanese-born Korean former professional boxer who competed from 1994 to 2006. He held the WBC super-flyweight title twice between 2000 and 2006.

Because of his affiliation with North Korea and his experience traveling to the country, he had been banned from entering South Korea and the United States. However, he changed his nationality to South Korean in February 2007. He studied Korean language at Yonsei University in South Korea in March 2007.

Biography 
Tokuyama was born in Tokyo, Japan as a third generation Zainichi Korean. After graduating from Tokyo Korean Junior and Senior High School, he made his professional debut in 1994, and challenged the Japanese Flyweight Title twice in 1997, but was unsuccessful both times. He won the vacant OPBF Super Flyweight Title in 1999, and defended it twice. His first world title match was against South Korean fighter In-Joo Cho in 2000, whom he beat by unanimous decision over 12 rounds, becoming the first North Korean to win a boxing world title. He defended his WBC and lineal super-flyweight titles eight times before suffering a stunning first-round knockout loss to Katsushige Kawashima in 2004. Tokuyama returned after a one-year lay-off to fight Kawashima on July 18, 2005. Tokuyama was knocked down in the last round, but dominated Kawashima for the rest of the fight, regaining his title by unanimous decision. He defended his title on February 27, 2006, beating José Navarro by unanimous decision. He relinquished his title after this fight and announced his intention to retire from boxing, but later announced that he would continue his career if he could fight Hozumi Hasegawa for the WBC bantamweight title. Tokuyama finalized his retirement on March 14, 2007, since Hasegawa declined his challenge for the bantamweight title. Tokuyama cited lack of motivation as the major reason for his retirement.

Tokuyama and North Korea 
Zainichi Koreans either tried to conceal their roots by adopting Japanese names, or only used their real names to show that they were Korean. However, Tokuyama did neither, using both his Japanese name (Masamori Tokuyama) and real name (Chang-soo Hong), while declaring that he is a Zainichi Korean. He has often taken politics inside the ring, carrying a North Korean flag in his entrances and wearing trunks labeled "One Korea." Many of Tokuyama's fans regard his performances as the emergence of a new generation of Zainichi Koreans, who are not afraid of their heritage, while others negatively view Tokuyama as using sports to promote a political agenda.

Tokuyama visited North Korea in 2001, and reportedly made a statement vowing allegiance to the leader of North Korea, Kim Jong-il, thanking the leader for his success as a boxer.  In 2002, former Japanese prime minister Junichiro Koizumi made a visit to North Korea, which revealed the kidnappings of several Japanese citizens in the 1970s and 80s by North Korea. News of the kidnappings received huge media coverage in Japan, and Tokuyama's website was spammed relentlessly with abusive messages when it was rumored that Tokuyama commented: "They (the kidnapped Japanese citizens) might actually be living pretty happily in North Korea."

See also
List of super flyweight boxing champions
List of WBC world champions
List of Japanese boxing world champions
Boxing in Japan

References

External links 
 
  
 Masamori Tokuyama - CBZ Profile

|-

|-

1974 births
Living people
North Korean male boxers
North Korean expatriates in Japan
South Korean expatriate sportspeople in Japan
South Korean people of North Korean origin
Sportspeople from Tokyo
Super-flyweight boxers
World boxing champions
World Boxing Council champions
World super-flyweight boxing champions
Zainichi Korean people
South Korean male boxers
People's Athletes